In systems engineering and requirements engineering, a non-functional requirement (NFR) is a requirement that specifies criteria that can be used to judge the operation of a system, rather than specific behaviours. They are contrasted with functional requirements that define specific behavior or functions. The plan for implementing functional requirements is detailed in the system design. The plan for implementing non-functional requirements is detailed in the system architecture, because they are usually architecturally significant requirements.

Definition 

Broadly, functional requirements define what a system is supposed to do and non-functional requirements define how a system is supposed to be.  Functional requirements are usually in the form of "system shall do <requirement>", an individual action or part of the system, perhaps explicitly in the sense of a mathematical function, a black box description input, output, process and control functional model or IPO Model. In contrast, non-functional requirements are in the form of "system shall be <requirement>", an overall property of the system as a whole or of a particular aspect and not a specific function. The system's overall properties commonly mark the difference between whether the development project has succeeded or failed.

Non-functional requirements are often called the "quality attributes" of a system. Other terms for non-functional requirements are "qualities", "quality goals", "quality of service requirements", "constraints", "non-behavioral requirements", or "technical requirements". Informally these are sometimes called the "ilities", from attributes like stability and portability. Qualities—that is non-functional requirements—can be divided into two main categories:

 Execution qualities, such as safety, security and usability, which are observable during operation (at run time).
 Evolution qualities, such as testability, maintainability, extensibility and scalability, which are embodied in the static structure of the system.

Examples 

A system may be required to present the user with a display of the number of records in a database. This is a functional requirement. How current this number needs to be, is a non-functional requirement. If the number needs to be updated in real time, the system architects must ensure that the system is capable of displaying the record count within an acceptably short interval of the number of records changing.

Sufficient network bandwidth may be a non-functional requirement of a system. Other examples include:

 Accessibility
 Adaptability
 Auditability and control
 Availability (see service level agreement)
 Backup
 Boot up time
 Capacity, current and forecast
 Certification
 Compliance
 Configuration management
 Conformance
 Cost, initial and Life-cycle cost
 Data integrity
 Data retention
 Dependency on other parties
 Deployment
 Development environment
 Disaster recovery
 Documentation
 Durability
 Efficiency (resource consumption for given load)
 Effectiveness (resulting performance in relation to effort)
Elasticity
 Emotional factors (like fun or absorbing or has "Wow! Factor")
 Environmental protection
 Escrow
 Exploitability
 Extensibility (adding features, and carry-forward of customizations at next major version upgrade)
 Failure management
 Fault tolerance (e.g. Operational System Monitoring, Measuring, and Management)
 Flexibility (e.g. to deal with future changes in requirements)
 Footprint reduction - reduce the exe files size
 Integrability (e.g. ability to integrate components)
 Internationalization and localization
 Interoperability
 Legal and licensing issues or patent-infringement-avoidability
 Maintainability (e.g. mean time to repair – MTTR)
 Management
 Memory Optimization
 Modifiability
 Network topology
 Open source
 Operability
 Performance / response time (performance engineering)
 Platform compatibility
 Privacy (compliance to privacy laws)
 Portability
 Quality (e.g. faults discovered, faults delivered, fault removal efficacy)
 Readability  
 Reliability (e.g. mean time between/to failures – MTBF/MTTF)
 Reporting
 Resilience
 Resource constraints (processor speed, memory, disk space, network bandwidth, etc.)
 Response time
 Reusability
 Robustness
 Safety or factor of safety
 Scalability (horizontal, vertical)
 Security (cyber and physical)
 Software, tools, standards etc. Compatibility
 Stability
 Supportability
 Testability
 Throughput
 Transparency
 Usability (human factors) by target user community
 Volume testing

See also
ISO/IEC 25010:2011
Consortium for IT Software Quality
ISO/IEC 9126
FURPS
Requirements analysis
Usability requirements
Non-Functional Requirements framework
Architecturally Significant Requirements
SNAP Points

References

External links

Software requirements
Systems engineering
Software quality